Marquess of Cambridge was a title that was created twice, once in the Peerage of England and once in the Peerage of the United Kingdom.

The first creation was for Prince George Augustus in 1706, when he was created Duke of Cambridge, Marquess of Cambridge, Earl of Milford Haven, Viscount Northallerton and Baron of Tewkesbury. He succeeded to the Dukedoms of Cornwall and Rothesay on his father's accession to the throne on 1 August 1714. His titles merged with the Crown when he succeeded to the throne as King George II in 1727.

The second creation (along with the subsidiary titles Earl of Eltham and Viscount Northallerton) was in 1917 for Adolphus, Duke of Teck, brother of Queen Mary and brother-in-law of King George V, when he gave up his German titles and took the surname "Cambridge". Adolphus Cambridge was a grandson of Prince Adolphus, Duke of Cambridge through his daughter Princess Mary Adelaide of Cambridge.

Upon the death of the second Marquess without any male heirs, the marquessate became extinct.

Marquess of Cambridge (1706-1727)
Prince George Augustus, Duke of Cambridge (1683-1760), Succeeded to the throne in 1727 as King George II

For further details see Duke of Cambridge

Marquesses of Cambridge (1917–1981)
Adolphus Charles Alexander Albert Edward George Philip Louis Ladislaus Cambridge, 1st Marquess of Cambridge (1868–1927), grandson of Prince Adolphus, Duke of Cambridge, was created Marquess when George V relinquished his family's German titles
George Francis Hugh Cambridge, 2nd Marquess of Cambridge (1895–1981), only son of the 1st Marquess, died without male issue and his honours became extinct

Family tree

References

Attribution

Noble titles created in 1706
British and Irish peerages which merged in the Crown
Noble titles created in 1917
Extinct marquessates in the Peerage of the United Kingdom